The 2018 Pirelli World Challenge is the 29th season of the Pirelli World Challenge. Patrick Long was the defending champion in the highest class, the GT class. It is the second season sanctioned by the United States Auto Club. The season began on 9 March in St. Petersburg and ended on 2 September at Watkins Glen. It is the first season of the new TCR class, while the TCB class has been removed from the series. 

On 25 May 2018, the series announced it had been acquired by the SRO Motorsports Group.

Calendar
On 17 November 2017, WC Vision announced the 2018 calendar. Circuit of the Americas will be the SprintX season opener instead of Virginia. Mid-Ohio and Sonoma were dropped from the schedule in favor of Portland and Watkins Glen. Laguna Seca, which played host for the Touring Car classes season finale weekend in 2017, will not return to the series.

Entry list

GT/GTA/GT Cup

GTS/GTSA

Notes
 – Drivers with an asterisk in the "Rounds" column took part in the non-championship round at Long Beach.

TCR/TCA

TC